Michael Ryan Mariot (born October 20, 1988) is an American professional baseball pitcher who is currently a free agent. He previously played in Major League Baseball (MLB) for the Kansas City Royals and Philadelphia Phillies.

Career

Kansas City Royals

Mariot was drafted by the Kansas City Royals in the eighth round of the 2010 Major League Baseball Draft out of the University of Nebraska. was added to the 40-man roster on November 20, 2013. He was called up to the majors for the first time on April 7, 2014. He was not a part of the Royals postseason roster, but earned his first World Series ring.

Philadelphia Phillies
On November 30, 2015, the Philadelphia Phillies claimed Mariot off waivers. He was called up the Phillies on August 3, 2016, when Jeanmar Gómez was granted paternity leave for the birth of his son. On December 6, 2016, Mariot was designated for assignment following the signing of Joaquín Benoit. He elected free agency on November 6, 2017.

San Diego Padres
In November 2017, he signed a minor league contract with the San Diego Padres. Mariot was invited to Major League spring training that year as a non-roster invitee. He was released on May 11, 2018.

Second stint with Royals
On May 18, 2018, Mariot signed a minor league deal with the Kansas City Royals. Mariot was released on August 8, 2018.

Sugar Land Skeeters
On August 24, 2018, Mariot signed with the Sugar Land Skeeters of the Atlantic League of Professional Baseball. He re-signed with the team for the 2019 season.

Toros de Tijuana
On June 5, 2019, Mariot's contract was purchased by the Toros de Tijuana of the Mexican League. He was released on July 29, 2019.

Tecolotes de los Dos Laredos
On July 29, 2019, Mariot signed with the Tecolotes de los Dos Laredos of the Mexican League. He became a free agent following the season.

Cleburne Railroaders
On March 29, 2021, Mariot signed with the Cleburne Railroaders of the American Association of Professional Baseball. Mariot recorded a 2-0 record and 1.00 ERA across 3 appearances for Cleburne.

Cincinnati Reds
On June 6, 2021, Mariot’s contract was purchased by the Cincinnati Reds organization. Mariot made 19 appearances (18 of them starts) with the Triple-A Louisville Bats, working to a 6-5 record and 4.02 ERA with 83 strikeouts in 103.0 innings of work. He elected free agency following the season on November 7.

Philadelphia Phillies (second stint)
On March 16, 2022, Mariot signed a minor league contract with the Washington Nationals. He was released on March 23. On March 30, Mariot signed a minor league contract with the Philadelphia Phillies organization.

Detroit Tigers
On June 15, 2022, Mariot was traded to the Detroit Tigers and assigned to the Triple-A Toledo Mud Hens.

CTBC Brothers
On July 24, 2022, Mariot's contract was purchased by the CTBC Brothers of the Chinese Professional Baseball League. He was released on September 19, 2022.

References

External links

Nebraska Cornhuskers bio

1988 births
Living people
Baseball players from California
Major League Baseball pitchers
Kansas City Royals players
Philadelphia Phillies players
Nebraska Cornhuskers baseball players
Idaho Falls Chukars players
Wilmington Blue Rocks players
Northwest Arkansas Naturals players
Omaha Storm Chasers players
Tigres del Licey players
American expatriate baseball players in the Dominican Republic
Clearwater Threshers players
Reading Fightin Phils players
Lehigh Valley IronPigs players
El Paso Chihuahuas players
People from West Hills, Los Angeles
Gigantes del Cibao players
Sugar Land Skeeters players
American expatriate baseball players in Mexico
Tecolotes de los Dos Laredos players
Toros de Tijuana players
Cleburne Railroaders players
Louisville Bats players
Toledo Mud Hens players
American expatriate baseball players in Taiwan
CTBC Brothers players